"Pecadora"  is the second single and title track of Mexican singer-songwriter Lila Downs's third Spanish album Pecados y Milagros. The song was written by Lila Downs and Paul Cohen, and was released on November 21, 2011. "Pecadora" was announced as the second single from the album on November 19, 2011 via Lila Downs's official fan site.

References

External links
 Lanza Lila Downs Pecadora como 2° Sencillo de Pecados y Milagros

2011 singles
Ska songs